Indole-3-pyruvate monooxygenase (YUC2 (gene), spi1 (gene)) is an enzyme with systematic name indole-3-pyruvate,NADPH:oxygen oxidoreductase (1-hydroxylating, decarboxylating). This enzyme catalyses the following chemical reaction

 (indol-3-yl)pyruvate + NADPH + H+ + O2  (indol-3-yl)acetate + NADP+ + H2O + CO2

Indole-3-pyruvate monooxygenase is a plant enzyme.

References

External links 
 

EC 1.14.13